Katwa  is a  Kolkata Suburban Railway  Junction Station on the Howrah–Bandel–Katwa line, Barharwa–Azimganj–Katwa and the Howrah–New Jalpaiguri line. It is located in Purba Bardhaman district in the Indian state of West Bengal. It serves Katwa and the surrounding areas.

History
In 1913, the Hooghly–Katwa Railway constructed a  broad gauge line from Bandel to Katwa, and the Barharwa–Azimganj–Katwa Railway constructed the  broad gauge Barharwa–Azimganj–Katwa loop.

The -long -wide narrow-gauge Burdwan–Katwa Railway was opened in 1915 as part of McLeod's Light Railways, taken over by Eastern Railway in 1966 and closed in 2010.

The -long -wide narrow-gauge Ahmedpur–Katwa Railway was opened in 1917 as part of McLeod's Light Railways and taken over by Eastern Railway in 1966. It was closed in 2013 for conversion to  broad gauge and electrification.

Gauge conversion
The Bardhaman–Katwa line, after conversion from narrow gauge to electrified broad gauge, was opened to the public on 12 January 2018.

The track from Katwa to Ahmedpur line after conversion from narrow gauge to broad gauge, was opened to the public on 24 May 2018.

Electrification
Electrification of the Bandel–Katwa line was completed with 25 kV AC overhead system in 1994–96.

Narrow-gauge travel
Here is a description of narrow-gauge travel (now closed):

References

External links
 
 Trains to Howrah
Trainns from Howrah

Railway stations in Purba Bardhaman district
Howrah railway division
Railway junction stations in West Bengal
1913 establishments in India
Kolkata Suburban Railway stations